Esteban Fernández de Castro (13th-century) was a Galician nobleman, Lord of Lemos and Sarria.

Biography 

Esteban  was the son of Fernán Gutiérrez de Castro and Mélia Iñiguez de Mendoza. His wife was Aldonza daughter of Rodrigo Afonso de León and granddaughter of Alfonso IX.

References 

13th-century Castilian nobility
House of Castro